Lola Créton (born 16 December 1993) is a French actress. Créton began her career at the age of 10, appearing in the short film Imago (2004). She is known for her lead roles in the films Goodbye First Love (2011) and Something in the Air (2012).

Filmography

References

External links
 

1993 births
Living people
French child actresses
French film actresses
French television actresses
21st-century French actresses
Actresses from Paris